The Iran Atmospheric Science and Meteorological Research Center or in brief ASMERC as a member of the World Meteorological Organization (WMO) is a research center is affiliated with the Iran Meteorological Organization and is a subset of the Ministry of Roads & Urban Development of Iran.

The ASMERC research institute started with the aim of conducting studies and researches related to meteorological science in 1989 and is headquartered in Tehran, Iran.

History
The Atmospheric Science and Meteorological Research Center (ASMERC) was founded in 1989 with the approval of the Ministry of Science, Research and Technology (Iran). In 1995, after receiving a definite license for its first research institute called "Meteorological Research Institute", it officially started working. At the beginning of this research, in addition to defining and performing its independent tasks, it was within the framework of three research groups.

Scientific structure
The Atmospheric Science and Meteorological Research Center (ASMERC) soon expanded to nine research groups. With nine research groups in various fields of meteorology, this research institute conducts studies and researches related to pure meteorological science and recognizes, expands and presents their applications. Also, an important part of the activities of this research institute is educational cooperation with higher education centers in fields related to meteorological sciences.

 Nine research groups of the ASMERC include:
 Dynamic & Synoptic Meteorology
 Climatology
 Physical Meteorology & Weather Modification
 Agrometeorology
 Hydrometeorology
 Atmospheric Chemistry, Ozone, and Air pollution
 Marine Meteorology & Physical Oceanography
 Atmospheric prospecting
 Aeronautical Meteorology

Projects
Among the successful projects of the ASMERC, could be mention the production of an automated system for issuing accurate forecasts of Precipitation, Temperature and water level of reservoirs and dams for some catchment areas of the country (such as Karun).

In the field of manufacturing technical devices and tools, the Radiosonde has been manufactured by the ASMERC in Iran.

Areas of activity
Some of the most important areas of activity of the ASMERC are:

 Issuance of point forecasts for various meteorological quantities such as daily minimum and maximum temperatures, precipitation, humidity, wind at ground level and higher levels
 Calculation and forecasting of meteorological indicators such as heat index and ...
 Provide meteorological databases for all parts of the country, even where there is no history of meteorological monitoring and data registration
 Meteorological studies related to the use of renewable energy
 Holding training courses in various meteorological trends

Scientific activities
The main purpose of The Atmospheric Science and Meteorological Research Center (ASMERC) is research in various fields of meteorology and atmospheric sciences. The research statistics of the ASMERC are:

 272 scientific articles in domestic journals and conferences
 22 internationally recognized articles (ISI)
 Holding 5 conferences
 Collaboration in preparing 196 articles with 36 scientific centers

See also
 List of Iranian research centers
 Science and technology in Iran
 Iran Meteorological Organization
 National Geographical Organization of Iran

References

External links
 Meteorological words with Persian equivalent
 Iran Rain Forecast by ASMERC
 Iran Temperature Forecasts (°C) by ASMERC
 Dust forecasts over Iran by ASMERC
 ASMERC articles on researchgate
 Research Institutions - Ministry of Science Research and Technology

Government agencies of Iran
Research institutes in Iran